Pictou East is a provincial electoral district in Nova Scotia, Canada, that elects one member of the Nova Scotia House of Assembly.

Its Member of the Legislative Assembly (MLA) since the 2013 election is Tim Houston of the Progressive Conservative Association of Nova Scotia who replaced Clarrie MacKinnon of the New Democratic Party of Nova Scotia.

Geography

Members of the Legislative Assembly
This riding has elected the following Members of the Legislative Assembly:

Election results

1949 general election

1953 general election

1956 general election

1960 general election

1963 general election

1967 general election

1970 general election

1974 general election

1978 general election

1981 general election

1984 general election

1988 general election

1993 general election

1993 by-election 

|-
 
|Liberal
|Wayne Fraser
|align="right"|4,417
|align="right"|59.60
|align="right"|
|-
 
|Progressive Conservative
|Mel MacLean
|align="right"|1,902
|align="right"|25.66
|align="right"|
|-
 
|New Democratic Party
|Dave Peters 
|align="right"|935
|align="right"|12.62
|align="right"|
|-

|Independent
|Alexander James MacKenzie
|align="right"|111
|align="right"|1.50
|align="right"|
|-

|Natural Law
|Peter H. Cameron
|align="right"|46
|align="right"|0.62
|align="right"|
|}

1998 general election

1999 general election

2003 general election

2006 general election

2009 general election

2013 general election 

|-
 
|Progressive Conservative
|Tim Houston
|align="right"| 3,714
|align="right"| 48.05
|align="right"|+22.11
|-
 
|New Democratic Party
|Clarrie MacKinnon
|align="right"| 2,788
|align="right"| 36.07
|align="right"|-27.91
|-
 
|Liberal
|Francois Rochon
|align="right"| 1,228
|align="right"| 15.89
|align="right"|+7.50
|}

2017 general election

2021 general election

References

External links
 riding profile

Nova Scotia provincial electoral districts